Rho guanine nucleotide exchange factor 2 is a protein that in humans is encoded by the ARHGEF2 gene.

Function 

Rho GTPases play a fundamental role in numerous cellular processes that are initiated by extracellular stimuli that work through G protein-coupled receptors. The encoded protein may form complex with G proteins and stimulate rho-dependent signals.

Interactions 

ARHGEF2 has been shown to interact with PAK1.

References

External links

Further reading